Army Reserve Aviation Command (ARAC) is the headquarters command for all aviation assets in the United States Army Reserve.  It is located at Fort Knox, Kentucky and is commanded by a Brigadier General.

The command consists of approximately 5,000 soldiers and 583 Department of the Army civilians, with 190 aircraft at facilities in 12 states.  The command's assets provide air assault, air movement, air traffic services airfield management, aeromedical evacuation, combat aviation brigade reinforcement, theater aviation support, and coordination of aviation staging and onward movement to theater.  It supports all Federal Emergency Management Agency regions within the United States to respond to emergencies.  The command was activated in its current formation on 16 September 2016 with the following subordinate units:

 Headquarters and Headquarters Company (HHC), Army Reserve Aviation Command (ARAC), at Fort Knox, Kentucky
11th Expeditionary Combat Aviation Brigade (11th ECAB), at Fort Carson, Colorado
 1st Battalion (Assault), 158th Aviation Regiment in Conroe, Texas, equipped with UH-60 Black Hawk
 6th Battalion (Theater) (Forward), 52nd Aviation Regiment in Los Alamitos, California
 8th Battalion (Assault), 229th Aviation Regiment at Fort Knox, Kentucky, equipped with UH-60 Black Hawk
 90th Aviation Support Battalion (90th ASB), at Fort Worth, Texas
 244th Expeditionary Combat Aviation Brigade (244th ECAB), at Joint Base McGuire-Dix-Lakehurst, New Jersey
 2d Battalion (Airfield Operations), 58th Aviation Regiment at Fort Rucker, Alabama
 5th Battalion (General Support), 159th Aviation Regiment at Fort Eustis, Virginia
 7th Battalion (General Support), 158th Aviation Regiment at Fort Hood, Texas

References

Aviation Commands of the United States Army
Military units and formations established in 2016